The term Battle of Nördlingen refers to two battles during the Thirty Years' War (1618-1648).

Battle of Nördlingen (1634) 
Battle of Nördlingen (1645)